

The Cunningham-Hall GA-21 was an American two-seat monoplane design to compete for the Guggenheim Safe Aircraft Competition in 1934. Its distinguishing feature was full span flaps which could be manually or automatically adjusted. The GA-36 was a military version of it with tandem, rather than side-by-side seating.

Design and development
 
The GA-21M was all metal aircraft apart from the fabric covering of parts of the wing, otherwise metal-covered, and the control surfaces. The low-set wings were rectangular in plan out to rounded tips and had a high lift section. Both flaps and ailerons filled the whole straight part of the trailing edge, so the latter only opened upwards.

Apart from its unusual flaps and lateral control the GA-21M was conventional. An open cockpit over the forward wing seated two side-by-side. The tailplane was mounted just above the fuselage on the fin and could be trimmed; essentially triangular in plan, it carried rounded elevators. A rounded rudder reached down to the keel.

The GA-21Ms had conventional, tailwheel landing gear with the landing wheels ahead of the leading edge within aircraft fairings that also enclosed the legs.

The GA-36 was a 1936 military trainer rebuild of the Ga-21M. This included a revised, tandem cockpit and more trouser-like landing gear fairings, making it 15% heavier.

The automated flaps worked well but were more complicated than, for example, Fowler flaps and more expensive to construct. Simpler systems were preferred and the sole GA-21M/36 was sold in 1941, stripped of major components and dumped until the 1980s when it was recovered, fully restored and put on display at the Niagara Aerospace Museum.

Specifications (GA-36)

References

1930s United States military trainer aircraft
Single-engined tractor aircraft
GA-36
Low-wing aircraft
Aircraft first flown in 1934